Princesa do Solimões Esporte Clube, commonly referred to as Princesa do Solimões, is a Brazilian professional club based in Manacapuru, Amazonas founded on 18 August 1971. It competes in the Campeonato Brasileiro Série D, the fourth tier of Brazilian football, as well as in the Campeonato Amazonense, the top flight of the Amazonas state football league.

History
The club was founded on 18 August 1971. Princesa do Solimões competed in the Série B in 1989, when they were eliminated in the First Stage of the competition. They won the Campeonato Amazonense for the first time in 2013.

Honours
 Campeonato Amazonense
 Winners (1): 2013

Stadium
Princesa do Solimões Esporte Clube play their home games at Estádio Olímpico Municipal Gilberto Mestrinho, nicknamed Gilbertão. The stadium has a maximum capacity of 15,000 people.

References

Association football clubs established in 1971
Football clubs in Amazonas (Brazilian state)
1971 establishments in Brazil